Thornbury is an inner-city suburb in Melbourne, Victoria, Australia,  north-east of Melbourne's Central Business District, located within the City of Darebin local government area.

Thornbury is bordered by the Merri Creek to the west, and the Darebin Creek to the east. The heart of Thornbury is known as Thornbury Village, and is located at the centre of Thornbury, at the intersection of High Street and Normanby Avenue/Clarendon Street.

Thornbury is shaped as a thin strip of land sandwiched between Northcote and Preston. Its east–west distance is four times its north–south distance. For 111 years, Thornbury was part of the former City of Northcote local government area, which existed from 1883 until June 1994. As such, Thornbury is universally understood to be a demographic and commercial satellite of Northcote, along with Westgarth, although the latter does not have its own postcode.

History

The area's name is derived from the name of a property of early settler, Jobbo Smith, with the name dating to 1850. Smith named his property after a farm near his English birthplace. High Street had a cable tram by 1890. This ran the length of High Street from Northcote to Preston. By 1901, a railway line to its west connected to the central city line. A cable tram engine house was built, with the building still existing on 628 High Street Thornbury. It contained both the engine house and the car shed.

St Mary's Catholic Church was built in 1916.

Industry

Thornbury has a long line of industry near Dundas Street (the border between Thornbury and Preston) and Station Street. It consists mainly of warehouses and scrap metal yards, with a few metal recycling centres and factories.

Transport

Bus
Seven bus routes service Thornbury:

 : Melbourne CBD (Queen Street) – La Trobe University. Operated by Kinetic Melbourne.
 : Melbourne CBD (Queen Street) – Northland Shopping Centre. Operated by Kinetic Melbourne.
 : Melbourne CBD (Queen Street) – La Trobe University via the Eastern Freeway. Operated by Kinetic Melbourne.
 : Essendon station – Ivanhoe station via Brunswick West, Moreland station, Thornbury and Fairfield. Operated by Moreland Buslines.
 : North East Reservoir – Northcote Plaza via High Street. Operated by Dysons.
 : Preston – West Preston via Reservoir. Operated by Dysons.
 : Northcote – Regent station via Northland Shopping Centre. Operated by Dysons.

Cycling
The Merri Creek Trail and Darebin Creek Trail run on the west and east boundaries of Thornbury respectively, and are popular shared-use recreational paths used by cyclists and walkers.

Train
Thornbury is served by one railway station: Thornbury, on the Mernda line.

Tram
Two tram routes service Thornbury, both operated by Yarra Trams:

 : West Preston – Victoria Harbour (Docklands)
 : Bundoora RMIT – Waterfront City (Docklands)

Geology

Thornbury geology mainly consists of Silurian sedimentary rocks of the Melbourne Formation (formerly Dargile). River sediments overlay parts of the folded Silurian rocks, especially near Merri Creek and Darebin Creek that represent the western and eastern borders of the suburb respectively.

Commerce

The main commercial area in Thornbury is the High Street shopping strip, centred on Thornbury Village. Smaller shopping precincts are to be found on sections of St Georges Road, Wales Street and Station Street. The Northcote Pottery, founded in 1897 at Clyde Street, was closed in 2007. The Thornbury Post Office is known for its unusual nuclear fission based power supply, still supplying power from when it was previously installed during the Post Master General (pre-1975) era of Australia Post.

Nightlife and culture

Thornbury is home to many bars and night spots, including Kitty Somerset, Tago Mago, The Thornbury Local, Cactus Room, The Thornbury Hotel, Welcome To Thornbury, The Thornbury Theatre, The Tap House, an art house cinema, and the Croxton Park Hotel, which often features overseas touring artists. It also has a large alternative music culture, which is evident in some of the independent music stores, often selling vinyl, found on High Street such as Thornbury Records, and shops selling musical instruments.

From about 2012 onwards, Thornbury has seen new bars, cafes and restaurants appear along the previously quiet retail section of the northern end of High Street, including Joanies, Thornbury Taphouse, Barton Fink, Palladinnos, Wolf and Swill, Carwyn Cellars, 3 Ravens and Nasty's.

Thornbury has its own art house movie theatre, the Thornbury Picture House, which was built inside a 100 year old large mechanics workshop and opened in 2018.

Heritage protection of architecture

An area of Thornbury, referred to as the Thornbury Park Estate Precinct, consists of a mix of housing built in the Victorian era, late Federation and the interwar period. After a backlash from residents about the proposed demolition of a 1920s Church Manse on Comas Grove in particular, the local council established a temporary heritage overlay, protecting the buildings. Old buildings, some 100 years old, were regularly being demolished and replaced with newer buildings, and in some cases, apartments. The Thornbury Park Estate Precinct - Proposed Heritage Overlay established temporary protection, initiated in April 2022, and saved houses in the area from demolition

Sporting facilities

The Darebin International Sports Centre (DISC) is located in the John Cain Memorial Reserve, near the Darebin Creek in Thornbury. The Darebin International Sports Centre is the home of Football Federation Victoria, the State Football Centre (soccer), the State Lawn Bowls Centre and the State Cycling Centre, a velodrome with a 250m indoor timber cycling track. The Northcote Public Golf Course, run by the Northcote Golf Club, is located near the Merri Creek. It is also home to Flinders Park and the Holy Trinity Cricket Club (HTCC).

Educational facilities

 Thornbury Primary School (Opened 2 August 1915)
 Wales Street Primary School (opened 1 October 1891 as the 'Prince of Wales Park State School')
 Penders Grove Primary School
 Thornbury High School (Renamed from Thornbury-Darebin Secondary College in 2005)
 Holy Spirit School (Catholic) (Opened 3 February 1953)
 St. Mary's Primary school (Catholic) (Opened January 1920)
 Distance Education Centre – The headquarters of this Department of Education agency, co-located near the Darebin Creek with the Victorian School of Languages, the headquarters of this Department of Education agency.
 Nestoras Greek College

Public open spaces

 Strettle Wetland (Merri Creek)
 Northcote Municipal Golf Links
 Mayer Park
 Sir Douglas Nichols Reserve
 Penders Park (Electric barbecues, playground)
 Hayes Park (Oval)
 John Cain Memorial Reserve (Including the Darebin International Sports Centre facilities, four soccer fields, the State Cycling Centre velodrome and the State Lawn Bowls Centre)
 Clyde Jones Reserve (Playground and Grassy Area)

Notable residents
 Bill Lawry - Australian former cricketer and commentator
 Jack Blandford and Matt Benton – Founders of BOTR 69
 Jane Hall – actor and radio personality
 Normie Rowe – singer and TV personality
 Vince Colosimo – actor and TV personality

See also
 City of Northcote – Thornbury was previously within this former local government area.

References

External links
 Darebin Community Portal, maintained by the City of Darebin

Suburbs of Melbourne
Suburbs of the City of Darebin